The Enemy Within: The McClellan Committee's Crusade Against Jimmy Hoffa and Corrupt Labor Unions is a book by American politician Robert F. Kennedy (assisted by John Seigenthaler) first published in 1960, and republished in 1994.  Edwin Guthman, chairman of the Robert F. Kennedy Memorial provided the introduction to the 1994 edition. As Robert Kennedy was intimately involved, the book is somewhat autobiographical.

The work details events and information uncovered between 1956 and 1959 by the United States Senate Select Committee on Improper Activities in Labor and Management in which Kennedy served as chief counsel. The book focuses on corruption, crime and graft within American labor unions, with an emphasis on International Brotherhood of Teamsters, as well as union busting by employers. Kennedy describes the Teamsters as the most powerful institution in the United States aside the United States Government itself (1994, p. 161). According to Robert Kennedy, George Meany, former president of the AFL–CIO, has called Jimmy Hoffa organized labor's No. 1 Enemy (1994, p. 161).

In 1961, Twentieth Century Fox bought the film rights to The Enemy Within.

References

Works by Robert F. Kennedy
Robert F. Kennedy
Political books
Trade unions in the United States
1960 non-fiction books
Jimmy Hoffa